Samuel Byron Dicker (born April 4, 1889 in New York City; died February 9, 1960) was an American lawyer and statistician and the 58th Mayor of Rochester from 1939 to 1955.

He was also a director of the Rochester and Genesee Valley Railroad.

References

1889 births
Mayors of Rochester, New York
Cornell University alumni
1960 deaths
New York (state) Republicans
American Jews
20th-century American politicians